Eagle Nest Lake State Park is a state park in New Mexico, United States.  

It was established on July 3, 2004. Its main attraction is a  lake which is popular for fishing and boating in the summer, and ice fishing and snowmobiling in the winter. 

The lake itself is a man-made reservoir created when the Cimarron River was impounded by the Eagle Nest Dam in 1918. Before this, the St Louis, Rocky Mountain and Pacific Railroad did some grading work in 1907 on an unfinished extension from its terminus at Ute Park to Taos, including boring a tunnel here.

The lake is home to several species of fish, including rainbow trout, brown trout, cutthroat trout, kokanee salmon, smallmouth bass, yellow perch, common carp, white sucker, channel catfish, sunfish, and northern pike, which were accidentally introduced into Eagle Nest Lake (the park recommends anglers to keep the pike, because of their threat to the lake's gamefish populations).

The surrounding mountains are rich in wildlife such as elk, deer, turkeys and bears.

Gallery

References

External links
 Eagle Nest Lake State Park
 Friends of Eagle Nest Lake and Cimarron Canyon State Parks

Lakes of the Rocky Mountains
State parks of New Mexico
Parks in Colfax County, New Mexico
Protected areas established in 2004
Provincial and state parks in the Rocky Mountains